Retroreflectors are devices which reflect light back to its source. Five were left at five sites on the Moon by three crews of the Apollo program and two remote landers of the Lunokhod program. Lunar reflectors have enabled precise measurement of the Earth–Moon distance since 1969 using lunar laser ranging.

Successfully placed reflectors

Attempted and planned reflectors

Gallery

See also
 Lunar laser ranging
 List of artificial objects on the Moon
 List of missions to the Moon

References

Lunar science
Space lists